Semyonovskoye is a rural locality (a selo) in Kolokshanskoye Rural Settlement, Sobinsky District, Vladimir Oblast, Russia. The population was 185 as of 2010. There are 4 streets.

Geography 
Semyonovskoye is located on the Sodyshka River, 26 km northeast of Sobinka (the district's administrative centre) by road. Vladimirovka is the nearest rural locality.

References 

Rural localities in Sobinsky District
Vladimirsky Uyezd